Robert Pryor Henry (November 24, 1788 – August 25, 1826) was a U.S. Representative from Kentucky.

Born in Henrys Mills, Kentucky (then a part of Virginia), Henry pursued classical studies and was graduated from Transylvania College, Lexington, Kentucky.
He studied law.
He was admitted to the bar in 1809 and commenced practice in Georgetown, Kentucky. He owned slaves.
He served as prosecuting attorney in 1819.
He served in the War of 1812.
He moved to Hopkinsville in 1817.

Henry was elected as a Jackson Republican to the Eighteenth Congress and reelected as a Jacksonian candidate to the Nineteenth Congress and served from March 4, 1823, until his death in Hopkinsville, Kentucky, August 25, 1826. His brother John Flournoy Henry took over his seat until the next election in 1827.
He was interred in Pioneer Cemetery in Hopkinsville.

See also
List of United States Congress members who died in office (1790–1899)

References

1788 births
1826 deaths
People from Scott County, Kentucky
American people of Scottish descent
Democratic-Republican Party members of the United States House of Representatives from Kentucky
Jacksonian members of the United States House of Representatives from Kentucky
Kentucky lawyers
American slave owners
American military personnel of the War of 1812
People from Kentucky in the War of 1812